Wild Things Park is a 3,200-seat multi-purpose baseball stadium in North Franklin Township, a suburb of Washington, Pennsylvania.  It hosted its first regular season baseball game on May 29, 2002, as the primary tenants of the facility, the Washington Wild Things, lost to the Canton Coyotes, 3-0.  The ballpark also hosts the California Vulcans baseball team, representing Pennsylvania Western University California. It was the home of the Pennsylvania Rebellion of the National Pro Fastpitch, a women's professional softball league, until 2017 when the team folded. It also hosts Trinity High School's baseball team and the WPIAL Baseball Championships. It was briefly the home of the Pittsburgh Riverhounds soccer club (who now play at Highmark Stadium) during the 2005 and 2006 seasons. Wild Things Park is located near Interstate 70 and is notable for including a hot tub in the viewing stands. ProGrass Synthetic Turf was installed in the fall of 2010.

The stadium was known as Falconi Field until April 12, 2007, when Consol Energy and Washington County Family Entertainment entered a naming rights partnership to rename the complex CONSOL Energy Park. Consol Energy has let the naming rights deal expire as of January 2017.

History
In 2001, a 16-member "baseball exploratory committee" led by Leo Trich, member of the Pennsylvania House of Representatives, helped form a nonprofit group named Ballpark Scholarships Inc. to build a $5.8 million ($ million today) stadium in Washington County. $2 million of the cost of the stadium came in form of taxpayer assistance, while the rest was funded privately. A large amount of the private financing needed to build the stadium came from a local businessman, Angelo F. Falconi. The Wild Things made their debut on May 25, 2002 at Falconi Field for an exhibition game against the Johnstown Johnnies.

Trich originally hoped to bring an affiliated Class A minor league team to Washington, however he was unsuccessful. Meanwhile, a local group purchased the Canton Crocodiles of the independent Frontier League and moved them to the stadium to begin play as the Washington Wild Things in 2002. The team lost its inaugural game 3-0 to the Canton Coyotes.

The Wild Things rebounded from losing their first game to finish 56-28 and reached the Frontier League championship, which they lost to the Richmond Roosters three games to one. Playoffs included, the Wild Things drew 132,901 to Falconi Field in 2002. The year before the franchise had their games attended by just 29,703 fans in Canton, which is five times the population of Washington.

On April 12, 2007, the stadium's name was changed to CONSOL Energy Park after the Washington County-based coal mining company paid an undisclosed sum as part of a 10-year naming rights agreement. A plant garden just inside of the main entrance in right field contains a sign thanking Falconi for his contribution in the stadium's construction.

In 2012, WashCo Ballpark Holdings purchased the park from the non-profit Ballpark Scholarships Inc. in a deal that guaranteed that baseball will remain in the park for a decade.  Leo Trich played a role in selling the park.  At that time, Dermontti Dawson joined the ownership team. The Washington BlueSox played at the stadium from 2006 to 2008 until the team was moved to Butler. They also played at Ross Memorial Park and Alexandre Stadium during their tenure in Washington.

Concerts
Bob Dylan played at Falconi Field in 2006. He returned to the park in 2009, this time with John Mellencamp and Willie Nelson.

On August 25, 2012, the Povertyneck Hillbillies played a reunion concert at the park.  The group, based in western Pennsylvania, had minor national fame when they signed to the now defunct Rust Records.

See also
Ross Memorial Park and Alexandre Stadium

References

External links
Photographs of CONSOL Energy Park, home of the Washington Wild Things - Rochester Area Ballparks
Washington County Family Entertainment and CONSOL Energy Form Complex Naming Rights Partnership
Baseball Pilgrimages: CONSOL Energy Park

Baseball venues in Pennsylvania
Soccer venues in Pennsylvania
Pittsburgh Riverhounds SC
Frontier League ballparks
California Vulcans
Sports venues completed in 2002